Frans Van Vlierberghe (born 28 March 1954) is a Belgian former professional racing cyclist. He rode in two editions of the Tour de France. He also won a stage of the 1979 Vuelta a España.

Major results

1976
 1st Stage 2a Four Days of Dunkirk
 2nd Nationale Sluitingprijs
 3rd GP Victor Standaert
 4th De Kustpijl
 9th Tour du Condroz
1977
 1st Omloop van Midden-Brabant
 3rd Le Samyn
 10th De Kustpijl
1978
 1st Flèche Hesbignonne
1979
 1st Stage 12 Vuelta a España
 3rd Grote Prijs Jef Scherens
1982
 7th De Kustpijl
1983
 2nd Omloop Schelde-Durme
 10th Ronde van Limburg
1984
 2nd Omloop Schelde-Durme

References

External links
 

1954 births
Living people
Belgian male cyclists
Sportspeople from Sint-Niklaas
Cyclists from East Flanders
Belgian Vuelta a España stage winners